Basti  is a 2003 Indian crime film. The film stars Samir Soni and Faisal Khan in lead roles, with Sheeba in a special guest appearance, Shama Sikander, Govind Namdeo, Sadashiv Amrapurkar and Kulbhushan Kharbanda in supporting roles.

Plot
The film starts with a voice (Kader Khan) narrating a small town of Mumbai. A gangster named Kanta (Sadashiv Amrapurkar) wants to destroy the town and is in a battle with Karanjia (Kulbhushan Kharbanda), who wants to replace the town with a shopping mall. Ramesh "Rama" Kulkarni (Samir Soni) returns to his town after several years and is greeted by all of his friends, neighbors and youngest sister, Pinky (Mamta Mishra). It's only Rama's father, Vinayak Kulkarni (Govind Namdeo), a school teacher, who does not greet him and is angered with Rama.

A few days later, Rama's younger brother, Satish (Faisal Khan), returns after completing his studies. Rama begins guarding his town against the gangsters of the town. Karanjia hires Rama and gives him some money and weapons for his protection. Rama buys gifts for his family, but everyone refuses to take the gifts, and they refuse him into his family. Rama decides to marry Madhu (Sanober Kabir), a girl who has fallen in love with Rama.

During a festival of Shi'a Muslims, Kanta and his gangsters start terrorizing it. Rama and his friends began fighting Kanta's gangsters, until Rama is killed by Kanta's gangsters. Karanjia hires Satish, who decides to take the revenge for his brother's death. Satish is in love with a girl named Priya (Shama Sikander), whom Karanjia treats like his daughter. Satish's family gets destroyed, when his sister Pinky is raped by the Minister (Pramod Moutho), and his father is heartbroken at hearing the news. Pinky commits suicide, and Satish's father dies by a heart attack. Satish is outraged and kills Police Commissioner (Ranjeet), who is replaced by the new Commissioner of Maharashtra, Jabbar (Rajendra Gupta).

Karanjia has an evil plan to finish the Kulkarni family and rule over the town, where his partnership with Kanta is revealed. Karanjia's goons set out to kill Satish, where Priya saves Satish and gets shot in the heart by herself. It is thought that Satish is also dead. One day, Kanta and his goons start spreading terror in the town, until Satish fights with them and kills Kanta and his goons and is arrested for the murders by Commissioner Jabbar.

After Satish is imprisoned by the court, Karanjia pretends to be sad for Satish, until Satish begins fighting Karanjia and shoots him with his gun. At the same time, Commissioner Jabbar shoots Satish. Both Satish and Karanjia fall and die. The film's moral is that crime should not exist, and everyone should leave peacefully because the end is always wrong.

Cast
 Samir Soni as Ramesh "Rama" Kulkarni
 Snehal Dabi as Dannish
 Faisal Khan as Satish Kulkarni
 Sheeba
 Shama Sikander as Priya
 Govind Namdeo as Vinayak Kulkarni
 Sadashiv Amrapurkar as Kanta
 Kulbhushan Kharbanda as Karanjia
 Kader Khan as Narrator
 Liyaqat Bari as Natwar
 Brij Gopal as Inspector
 Rajendra Gupta as Commissioner Jabbar
 Sanober Kabir as Madhu
 Mamta Mishra as Pinky Kulkarni
 Ram Mohan as Usman
 Pramod Muthu as Minister
 Ranjeet as Police Commissioner

Soundtrack
There were four tracks in the film:

 "Madhoshiya Hai Tanhaiya Hai" by Sunidhi Chauhan, Udit Narayan
 "Locha Labacha Chalega Nahi" by Vinod Rathod
 "Gin Gin Kaise Kate Hai Din" by Sunidhi Chauhan
 "Chudi Khanake Boli" by Alka Yagnik

The songs were composed by Milind Sagar, and the lyrics were penned by Sudhankar Sharma and Anwar Sagar.

References

External links
 

2003 films
2000s crime action films
2000s Hindi-language films
2000s Urdu-language films
Indian crime action films
Urdu-language Indian films